All Fired Up may refer to:

TV and entertainment
All Fired Up (film), a 1982 French comedy film
"All Fired Up!", an episode of Hit o Nerae!
"All Fired Up!", a 1998 episode of Pokémon.

Music
All Fired Up! (tour), a concert tour by The Saturdays

Albums
All Fired Up (Fastway album)
All Fired Up (Poco album)
All Fired Up, an album by The Jets
All Fired Up!, an album by Smokie

Songs
"All Fired Up" (The Saturdays song)
"All Fired Up" (Pat Benatar song)
"All Fired Up" (Matt Corby song)
"All Fired Up", a song by Fastway from All Fired Up (Fastway album)
"All Fired Up", a song by the Brand New Heavies from Get Used to It
"All Fired Up", a song by Dan Seals from Fired Up
"All Fired Up", a song by Interpol from Our Love to Admire
"All Fired Up", a song by Judas Priest from Turbo
"All Fired Up", a song by Petra from album On Fire!
"All Fired Up", a song and 1987 single by Rattling Sabres written by Kerryn Tolhurst
"All Fired Up", a song by Slaughter from Back to Reality

See also 
Fired Up (disambiguation)